The cetera or cetara is a plucked string instrument played in Corsica. It has sixteen, or sometimes eighteen, metal strings, running in paired courses, with a body similar to the mandolin, but larger, and is plucked with a plectrum made of horn or tortoiseshell.

The Italian term also occurs in historical sources and usually interpreted to indicate a musical instrument of the cittern family.

See also 
 Cetra
 Cittern
 Roland Ferrandi

References

External links
 Cetara at The Stringed Instrument Database

Early musical instruments
Mandolin family instruments
Corsican musical instruments